Webb is an English and Scottish surname meaning weaver of cloth.

Notable people with the surname "Webb" include

A
Adrian Webb (born 1943), British academic
Aileen Osborn Webb (1892–1979), American aristocrat
Ambrose Henry Webb (1882–1964), Irish judge
Amy Webb (born 1974), American author
Alan Webb (disambiguation), multiple people
Alex Webb (disambiguation), multiple people
Alexander Webb (disambiguation), multiple people
Allan Webb (disambiguation), multiple people
Allen Webb (born 1983), American football player
Alli Webb, American entrepreneur
Alliene Brandon Webb (1910–1965), American composer
Alf Webb (1878–1932), English footballer
Alfred Webb (1834–1908), Irish politician
Alfreda Johnson Webb (1923–1992), American professor
Alice Webb, British television executive
Alicia Webb (born 1979), American professional wrestler
Alison Webb (born 1961), Canadian judoka
Alonzo C. Webb (1888–1975), American architect
Ameer Webb (born 1991), American sprinter
Anastasia Webb (born 1999), American artistic gymnast
Anthony Webb (disambiguation), multiple people
Archibald Webb (1866–1947), British painter
Archie R. Webb (1881–1961), American football coach
Art Webb (1893–1973), American football player
Arthur Webb (1868–1952), English cricketer
Arthur Webb (co-operator) (1868–1952), English co-operator
Aston Webb (1849–1930), British architect
Athol Webb (born 1935), Australian rules footballer
Austin Webb, American singer-songwriter

B
Baby Webb, American baseball player
Barbara Webb, Australian professor
Barbara Womack Webb (born 1956/1957), American judge
Barry Webb, Australian scholar
Beatrice Webb (1858–1943), British activist
Ben Webb (disambiguation), multiple people
Benjamin Webb (disambiguation), multiple people
Berry Webb (1915–1983), Australian cricketer
Beth Webb, British author
Betty Webb, American journalist
Betty Webb (code breaker) (born 1923), British code breaker
Bianca Webb (born 2001), Australian rules footballer
B. Linden Webb (1884–1968), Australian minister
Bobby Webb (born 1933), English footballer
Bobby Webb (tennis) (born 1953), American tennis player
Boogie Bill Webb (1924–1990), American singer-songwriter
Borlase Richmond Webb (1696–1738), British politician
Boyd Webb (born 1947), New Zealand artist
B. R. Webb (??–1860), American politician
Braden Webb (born 1995), American baseball player
Brad Webb, New Zealand sailor
Bradley Webb (born 2001), English footballer
Brandon Webb (born 1979), American baseball player
Brandon Webb (author) (born 1974), American soldier
Brenda Webb, Australian actress
Brent Webb (born 1979), New Zealand rugby league footballer
Brent W. Webb (born 1956), American professor
Bresha Webb (born 1984), American actress
Brian Webb (born 1945), English graphic designer
Brian Webb (railway historian) (1935–1981), British historian
Bronson Webb (born 1983), British actor
Bruce Webb (1939–2020), Australian rules footballer
Bryan Webb (born 1977), Canadian singer-songwriter

C
Cameron Webb (born 1982/1983), American physician
Caroline Webb (born 1971), British author
Carl "Charles" Webb formerly unidentified man known as "Somerton Man"
Carl Webb (born 1981), Australian rugby league footballer
Carl C. Webb (1901–1996), American journalist
Cassandra Webb, Australian-American actress
Cassell Webb, British-American musician
Catherine Webb (born 1986), English author
Catherine Webb (co-operative activist) (1859–1947), English activist
Cathleen Mae Webb (1961–2008), American criminal figure
Cecilia Webb (1888–1957), British sculptor
Charles Webb (disambiguation), multiple people
Charley Webb (born 1988), English actress
Cheryl Webb (born 1976), Australian race walker
Chick Webb (1909–1939), American musician
Chuck Webb (born 1969), American football player
Chloe Webb (born 1960), American actor
Christopher Webb (1886–1966), English designer
Christopher Webb (cricketer) (born 1950), New Zealand cricketer
Clarence Hungerford Webb (1902–1999), American doctor
Clifford Webb (1894–1972), English artist
Clifton Webb (disambiguation), multiple people
Cloyd Webb (1942–1991), Canadian football player
Cody Webb (born 1988), American motorcycle rider
Colin Webb (born 1937), British physicist
Colin Webb (cricketer) (1926–2015), Australian cricketer
Cooper Webb (born 1995), American motocross racer
Courtney Webb (born 1999), Australian cricketer

D
D. A. Webb (1912–1994), Irish botanist
Damon Webb (born 1995), American football player
Daniel Webb (disambiguation), multiple people
Darryl Webb (born 1988), American basketball player
Darryn Webb, New Zealand air force officer
David Webb (disambiguation), multiple people
Davis Webb (born 1995), American football player
Del Webb (1899–1974), American real estate developer
Derek Webb (born 1974), American singer-songwriter
Des Webb (1934–1987), New Zealand rugby union footballer
DeWitt Webb (1840–1917), American physician
Dick Webb, British actor
Donald Webb (disambiguation), multiple people
Douglas Webb (1922–1996), British photographer
Douglas Webb (police officer) (1909–1988), British police officer
Doyle Webb (born 1955), American politician
Duncan Webb (born 1967), New Zealand politician
Dunstan Webb, Australian actor

E
Earl Webb (1897–1965), American baseball player
Edmund Webb (1830–1899), Australian politician
Edmund F. Webb (1835–1898), American politician
Edward Webb (disambiguation), multiple people
Edwin Webb (disambiguation), multiple people
Electra Havemeyer Webb (1888–1960), American art collector
Ella Webb (1877–1946), Irish pediatrician
Eliza Osgood Vanderbilt Webb (1860–1936), American socialite
Elliott Webb (born 1971), English radio presenter
Ellsworth Webb (1931–2017), American boxer
Eloise Webb (born 1996), South African rugby sevens footballer
Elven Webb (1910–1979), British art director
Erasmus Webb (??–1614), English priest
Ercel F. Webb (1920–1999), American clergyman
Eric Webb (1889–1984), New Zealand engineer
Ernest Webb (1874–1937), British athlete

F
Francis Webb (disambiguation), multiple people
Frank Webb (disambiguation), multiple people
Fred Webb (1853–1917), British jockey
Freddie Webb (born 1942), Filipino basketball player

G
Garth Webb (1918–2012), Canadian soldier
Gary Webb (disambiguation), multiple people
Geoffrey Webb (disambiguation), multiple people
George Webb (disambiguation), multiple people
Gerald Bertram Webb (1871–1948), English-American physician
Gillian Webb (born 1956), British rower
Gisela Webb, American religious scholar
Glenn F. Webb, American mathematician
Godfrey Webb (1914–2003), British author
Graham Webb (1944–2017), English racing cyclist
Graham Webb (broadcaster) (born 1936), Australian television presenter
Grant Webb (born 1979), New Zealand rugby union footballer
Gregory Webb (born 1950), American police officer

H
Haley Webb (born 1985), American actress and filmmaker
Hank Webb (born 1950), American baseball player
Harold Webb (1909–1989), American physicist
Harri Webb (1920–1994), Welsh poet
Harry Webb (disambiguation), multiple people
Henry Webb (disambiguation), multiple people
Herbert Webb (1913–1947), English cricketer
Holly Webb (born 1976), British writer
Howard Webb (born 1971), English football referee
Hubert Webb (born 1968), American criminal
Hubert Webb (cricketer) (1927–2010), English cricketer
H. Walter Webb (1856–1900) American railway executive

I
Iain Webb (born 1959), English ballet dancer
Iain R. Webb, British writer
Ike Webb (1874–1950), English footballer
Isaac Webb (shipbuilder) (1794–1840), American shipbuilder

J
Jack Webb (1920–1982), American actor
Jackie Webb (footballer) (born 1943), Scottish footballer
Jaco Webb, South African rugby league footballer
Jacob Webb (born 1993), American baseball player
James Webb (disambiguation), multiple people
Jamie Webb (born 1994), British athlete
Jane Webb (1925–2010), American actress
Jane Webb (Northampton, Virginia), American indentured servant
Janeen Webb (born 1951), Australian writer
Janet Webb (1930–1983), English actress
Jason Webb (born 1973), Filipino basketball coach
Jay Lee Webb (1937–1996), American singer
J. B. Webb (1929–2009), Australian activist
Jeff Webb (disambiguation), multiple people
Jennifer Webb (born 1979), American politician
Jennifer M. Webb (born 1953), Australian archaeologist
Jesse L. Webb Jr. (1923–1956), American politician
Jessica L. Webb, Canadian writer
Jessie Webb (1880–1944), Australian academic
J. Griswold Webb (1890–1934), American politician
Jim Webb (disambiguation), multiple people
Jimmy Webb (disambiguation), multiple people
J'Marcus Webb (born 1988), American football player
Joe Webb (born 1986), American football player
Joe Webb (horse trainer) (born 1928), American horse trainer
John Webb (disambiguation), multiple people
Jonathan Webb (born 1963), English rugby union footballer
Jonathan Webb (footballer) (born 1990), English footballer
Jonathon Webb (born 1983), Australian auto racing driver
Jonathon Webb (cricketer) (born 1992), English cricketer
Jordan Webb (born 1988), Canadian soccer player
Joseph Webb (1908–1962), British painter
Josephine Webb (born 1918), American electrical engineer
Josh Webb (footballer) (born 1995), English footballer
Judith Webb, British soldier
Judy Webb, English ecologist
Julian Webb (1911–2002), American politician
June Webb (born 1934), American singer-songwriter
Justin Webb (born 1961), British journalist

K
Karen Webb, Australian police officer
Karim Webb (born 1974), American restauranteur
Karrie Webb (born 1974), Australian golfer
Kate Webb (1943–2007), Australian journalist
Katharine Webb (disambiguation), multiple people
Katherine Webb (born 1989), American model
Kathleen Webb (born 1956), American comic book writer
Kathy Webb (born 1949), American politician
Katrina Webb (born 1977), Australian Paralympic athlete
Kaye Webb (1914–1996), British editor
Keith Webb (1933–2021), Australian rules footballer
Kenneth Webb (disambiguation), multiple people
Kevin Webb (born 1928), Australian rules footballer
Kevin Webb (rugby league) (born 1955), Australian rugby league footballer
Kevyn Webb (1924–1990), Australian rower

L
Lahilahi Webb (1862–1949), Hawaiian royal
Lardarius Webb (born 1985), American football player
Laurie Webb (born 1985), American singer-songwriter
Lawrence Webb, American politician
Lea Webb, American politician
Lee Webb (born 1981), American football player
Lefty Webb (1885–1958), American baseball player
Leland Justin Webb (1846–1893), American politician and lawyer
Leonard Webb (disambiguation), multiple people
Lindsay Webb (born 1973), Australian comedian
Lisa Webb (born 1984), Australian rules footballer
Lizbeth Webb (1926–2013), English actress
Lizzie Webb (born 1948), British fitness expert
Logan Webb (born 1996), American baseball player
Lon Webb, American baseball player
Lorna Webb (born 1983), English cyclist
Lou Webb (1911–1940), American racing driver
Lucy Webb, American actress
Lukas Webb (born 1996), Australian rules footballer
Luke Webb (born 1986), English footballer
Luke Webb (cricketer) (born 1995), English cricketer
Lydia Webb (1736–1793), English actress

M
Mal Webb (born 1966), Australian singer
Marc Webb (born 1974), American filmmaker
Marc Webb (footballer) (born 1979), Australian rules footballer
Marcus Webb (born 1970), American basketball player
Margaret Ely Webb (1877–1965), American illustrator
Margot Webb (1910–2005), American dancer
Maria Webb (1804–1873), Irish philanthropist
Marilyn Salzman Webb (born 1942), American author
Marilynn Webb (1937–2021), New Zealand artist
Marissa Webb, American fashion designer
Mark Webb (disambiguation), multiple people
Marshall B. Webb (born 1961), American general
Martell Webb (born 1989), American football player
Marti Webb (born 1944), English actress
Martin Webb (born 1964), British entrepreneur
Martyn Webb (1925–2016), Australian professor
Mary Webb (disambiguation), multiple people
Mason Webb (born 1986), American soccer player
Matthew Webb (1848–1883), British swimmer
Matthew Webb (footballer) (born 1976), English footballer
Maurice Webb (disambiguation), multiple people
Max Webb (1917–2018), Polish-American real estate developer
Maynard Webb (born 1955), American entrepreneur
Maysie Webb (1923–2005), British librarian
Merryn Somerset Webb (born 1970), English editor
Michael Webb (disambiguation), multiple people
Millard Webb (1893–1935), American screenwriter
Mimi Webb (born 2000), British singer-songwriter
Mojo Webb, American musician
Morgan Webb (born 1978), American television host
M. Price Webb (1862–1938), American politician
Murray Webb (born 1947), New Zealand artist

N
Nathan Webb (disambiguation), multiple people
Nathaniel Webb (disambiguation), multiple people
Neil Webb (born 1963), British footballer
Nick Webb (disambiguation), multiple people
Noel Webb (disambiguation), multiple people
Norm Webb (1921–1996), Australian rules footballer
Norris Webb (born 1945), Panamanian basketball player

O
Oliver Webb (born 1991), British auto racing driver

P
Paddy Webb (1884–1950), New Zealand unionist and politician
Patricia Ann Webb (1925–2005), English microbiologist
Patrick Webb (disambiguation), multiple people
Paul Webb (disambiguation), multiple people
Peggy Webb (born 1942), American author
Peggy Webb (politician), American politician
Peter Webb (disambiguation), multiple people
Philip Webb (1831–1915), British architect
Philip Carteret Webb (1702–1770), English barrister
Phyllis Webb (1927–2021), Canadian poet
Pinky Webb (born 1970), Filipino journalist

R
Raleigh Webb (born 1997), American football player
Ralph Webb (1887–1945), Canadian politician
Ralph Webb (American football) (born 1994), American football player
R. Curt Webb (born 1949), American politician
Rebecca Norris Webb (born 1956), American photographer
Red Webb (1924–1996), American baseball player
Reg Webb (1947–2018), English musician
Regina Webb (born 1980), American author
Reynolds Webb (1900–1989), Australian rules footballer
Rhys Webb (born 1988), Welsh rugby union footballer
Richard Webb (disambiguation), multiple people
Richie Webb, British comedy writer
Richmond Webb (born 1967), American football player
Rita Webb (1904–1981), English actress
R. J. Webb (born 1987), American football player
Robb Webb (1939–2021), American voice artist
Robert Webb (disambiguation), multiple people
Robin Webb (born 1945), English animal rights activist
Robin L. Webb (born 1960), American politician
Rod Webb (1910–1999), Canadian politician
Rodney Webb (born 1943), English rugby union footballer
Rodney Scott Webb (1935–2009), American judge
Roger Webb (1934–2002), British songwriter
Roger Webb (politician), American politician
Roy Webb (1888–1982), American film composer
Rupert Webb (1922–2018), English cricketer
Russell Webb (disambiguation), multiple people
Ryan Webb (born 1986), American baseball player

S
Sam Webb (disambiguation), multiple people
Sarah Webb (disambiguation), multiple people
Seán Webb (born 1983), Northern Irish footballer
Shane Webb (born 1980), Australian footballer
Sharni Webb (born 1991), Australian rules footballer
Sharon Webb (1936–2010), American author
Shaun Webb (born 1981), New Zealand-Japanese rugby union footballer
Shelley Webb, British television presenter
Shirley Webb (born 1981), British hammer thrower
Sid Webb (1884–1956), English footballer
Sidney Webb (1859–1947), British activist
Sidney Webb (cricketer) (1875–1923), English cricketer
Simon Webb (disambiguation), multiple people
Skeeter Webb (1909–1986), American baseball player
Suhaib Webb (born 1972), American religious figure
Spencer Webb (2000–2022), American football player
Sheyann Webb (born 1956), American activist
Speed Webb (1906–1994), American jazz drummer
Spider Webb (disambiguation), multiple people
Spud Webb (born 1963), American basketball player
Stan Webb (disambiguation), multiple people
Stephen Webb (disambiguation), multiple people
Steve Webb (disambiguation), multiple people
Steven Webb (born 1984), English actor
Stuart Webb (born 1980), Australian rugby league footballer
Suzanne Webb (born 1966), British politician

T
Tara Webb, Australian sound editor
T. I. Webb Jr. (1880–1975), American lawyer
Timothy James Webb (born 1967), Australian artist
Thomas Webb (disambiguation), multiple people
Todd Webb (1905–2000), American photographer
Tom Webb (born 1989), English footballer
Tony Webb (born 1945), English social scientist
Travis Webb (1910–1990), American auto racing driver
Tyler Webb (born 1990), American baseball player

U
Ulysses S. Webb (1864–1947), American lawyer and politician
Umeki Webb (born 1975), American basketball player

V
Vanessa Webb (born 1976), Canadian tennis player
Veronica Webb (born 1965), American model
Violet Webb (1915–1999), English track and field athlete

W
Wally Webb (1885–1956), Australian rugby league footballer
Walter Webb (disambiguation), multiple people
Watt W. Webb (1927–2020), American physicist
Wayne Webb (born 1957), American bowler
Wellington Webb (born 1941), American politician
Wendy Webb (born 1962), American author
Wilfred Webb (disambiguation), multiple people
William Webb (disambiguation), multiple people
Wilma Webb (born 1944), American politician
Wilse B. Webb (1920–2018), American psychologist
W. Roger Webb (born 1941), American academic administrator
Wyatt Webb (1941–2003), American basketball coach
Wyman W. Webb, Canadian judge

See also
Webb (given name), a page for people with the given name "Webb"
Attorney General Webb (disambiguation), a disambiguation page for Attorney Generals surnamed "Webb"
General Webb (disambiguation), a disambiguation page for Generals surnamed "Webb"
Judge Webb (disambiguation), a disambiguation page for Judge surnamed "Webb"
Justice Webb (disambiguation), a disambiguation page for Justices surnamed "Webb"
Senator Webb (disambiguation), a disambiguation page for Senator surnamed "Webb"

English-language surnames